Clarks River National Wildlife Refuge is an 8,040-acre (32.5 km) bottomland hardwood forest in western Kentucky near Benton. The refuge lies along the East Fork of the Clarks River and is the seasonal home to more than 200 species of migratory birds. The bottom lands are dominated with overcup oaks, bald cypress, and tupelo-gum, and the slightly higher, better drained areas are covered with willow oak, swamp chestnut oak, red oak, sweet gum, sycamore, ash, and elm.

References
Refuge website

National Wildlife Refuges in Kentucky
Protected areas of Graves County, Kentucky
Protected areas of Marshall County, Kentucky
Protected areas of McCracken County, Kentucky